King Zhao of Chu (died 489 BC) was from 515 to 489 BC the king of the State of Chu during the Spring and Autumn period of ancient China.  He was born Xiong Zhen and King Zhao was his posthumous title.  Documents unearthed in the former state also show his title as King Shao. King Zhao was the son of King Ping of Chu.

Life
In 506 BCE, King Helü of the State of Wu led an army to invade Chu.  His army was commanded by the military strategist Sun Tzu, author of The Art of War, as well as Wu Zixu, a Chu exile whose father and brother were killed by King Ping of Chu.  The Wu army routed the Chu army at the historic Battle of Boju, and the Chu commander Nang Wa fled to the state of Zheng.

The Wu army pursued the remaining Chu troops, won several more battles, and captured Ying, the capital of Chu.  Chu general Shen Yin Shu defeated the Wu army but was severely wounded, and was killed by a Chu officer at his own request.  King Zhao was forced to flee. During the escape he was wounded by a Chu arrow at Yunmeng from where he made his way through Yun to the State of Sui in northern Hubei. Chu Minister of State Shen Baoxu meanwhile headed for the State of Qin to plead for assistance from their army. At first, the Qin ruler Duke Ai was non-committal in his response but after Shen spent seven days kneeling and wailing in the Qin palace courtyard, Duke Ai was moved by his devotion and agreed to send troops to assist Chu. Thereafter the Wu army retreated and King Zhao returned to the Chu capital at Ying.

In Zhuangzi, a story is recorded regarding a sheep-butcher named Yue, a subject of King Zhao that fled from Chu when Wu attacked. Yue followed King Zhao, and returned with him when King Zhao returned to his capital. King Zhao wanted to give Yue gifts for what King Zhao saw as Yue's loyalty, but due to Yue's moral beliefs, Yue refused to accept any gifts despite repeated offers.

In 489 BCE, King Zhao witnessed the inauspicious meteorological phenomenon known as “Clouds like numerous red birds pressing the day to fly”. Not long afterwards, King Fuchai of Wu attacked the State of Chen and Chen requested assistance from King Zhao. The king led his troops personally and was killed during a subsequent battle.

Family
King Zhao was married to Zhen Jiang, daughter of the Marquess of Qi whilst his mother was Bo Ying. He also had one sister and at least three elder brothers born by concubines, namely Shen, Jie and Qi, sometimes known by their courtesy names as Zixi, Ziqi and Zilü.

References

Monarchs of Chu (state)
Chinese kings
6th-century BC Chinese monarchs
5th-century BC Chinese monarchs
Year of birth unknown
489 BC deaths